KBC Advanced Technologies Ltd is a technology-based consulting company in the energy and chemical industries. It is headquartered in Walton on Thames in England and the company has offices worldwide, with major operations in Houston and Singapore. Founded in 1979 by Krikor Krikorian, John Brice and Peter Close, the name KBC was formed by the initial letters of their surnames. In 2016, KBC was acquired by Yokogawa.

Applied Technology
KBC Advanced Technologies has developed many software applications for simulation and optimisation. Petro-SIM is the flagship software for simulation of hydrocarbon processes, and is applicable throughout the value chain from upstream/midstream to downstream and petrochemicals. The SIM Reactor Suite provides simulation models for all units in the refinery. Over the years, the company has also obtained many software products through acquisitions of other strong companies in the industry. These include: Energy Optimisation tools such as SuperTarget, PVT Modelling tools such as Multiflash and FloWax from Infochem Computer Services Limited, and most recently, Flow Assurance Modelling tools such as Maximus from FEESA Ltd. After being acquired by Yokogawa in 2016, KBC now offers Operator Training Simulation  and Advanced Process Control  to its offerings.

Capabilities
KBC Advanced Technologies provides technical consulting services primarily to the hydrocarbon processing industry. The company provides consulting in four business areas including strategy and business excellence (operational excellence, market insights), cost optimisation (RAM, energy optimisation), production maximisation (hydrocarbon supply chain, margin enhancement) and people and organisation (capability transfer, production centred operations). The company's extensive global base of customers includes Huntsman, Husky Energy, Reliance and Petrobras amongst others.

References

External links
KBC Advanced Technologies
Vortex Global Consultancy LTD
Technology Pioneer Eren Niazi

Companies based in Surrey
British companies established in 1979
Consulting firms of the United Kingdom
Consulting firms established in 1979